The Gandhara University is a private university located in Peshawar, Khyber Pakhtunkhwa, Pakistan. It is chartered by the Government of Khyber Pakhtunkhwa. Gandhara University was the first private medical university of Khyber Pakhtunkhwa. It provides specialized training in the health sciences. The institutes that became Gandhara University were initially founded in October 1995 by surgeon Muhammad Kabir. University is recognized by the Higher Education Commission (Pakistan) and accredited by the Pakistan Medical and Dental Council. It is also affiliated with the College of Physicians and Surgeons Pakistan for postgraduate dental courses.

Constituent colleges
The university encompasses specialized departments to include teaching in medicine, dentistry, pharmacy, paramedical technologies, nursing, physiotherapy and public health. These include:

 Kabir Medical College (which offers degree in MBBS)
 Sardar Begum Dental College (which offers degree in BDS)
 Naseer Teaching Hospital
 Gandhara College of Pharmacy
 Wazid Muhammad Institute of Paramedical Technology
 Farkhanda Institute of Nursing
 Kabir Institute of Public Health

References

External links
 Official website

Medical colleges in Khyber Pakhtunkhwa
1995 establishments in Pakistan
Educational institutions established in 1995
Private universities and colleges in Khyber Pakhtunkhwa
Universities and colleges in Peshawar